Carl Heinrich von Heineken (1707–1791) was a German art historian who for a time was in charge of King Augustus III of Poland's royal collection.

Biography
He was the son of Catharina Elisabeth Heinecken, an artist and alchemist, and Paul Heinecken, a painter and architect in Lübeck, Germany. His younger brother Christian Heinrich Heineken (1721-1725) was a child prodigy known as "the infant scholar of Lübeck".

Beginning in 1724, Heineken studied literature and law at the Leipzig University and the University of Halle. He became a private tutor around 1730, first in the household of Johann Ulrich  König, a Dresden court poet, and afterwards with Count Alexander von Sulkowsky. In 1739, he became the private secretary and librarian for Count Heinrich von Brühl, an important statesman and art collector.

In 1746, King Augustus III of Poland appointed him director of the royal collection of prints and drawings. Tasked with adding to the collection, he developed a wide network embracing artists, scholars, and collectors. Heineken was especially interested in woodcuts and engravings from the period before Albrecht Dürer and bought many examples for the collection. Among his acquisitions were paintings by Correggio and Raphael. He was knighted as a Reichsritter in 1749.

In 1756, at the outset of the Seven Years’ War, the  Prussians  arrested  Heineken and imprisoned him in the Dresden town hall. After the war, he was attacked for financial mismanagement, largely because of his close connection with Brühl. He was reimprisoned, charged with embezzlement, and stripped of office. Although eventually acquitted, he was required to leave Dresden.

Heineken spent the remainder of his life writing books about art in both German and French. He became known as an expert on the origins of engraving and other forms of printing. Some of his later books were printed by the Leipzig publisher Johann Gottlob Immanuel Breitkopf.

For a time, Heineken owned Altdöbern Castle, a baroque building in Brandenburg, Germany.

References

1707 births
1791 deaths
German art historians
Writers from Lübeck
Leipzig University alumni
University of Halle alumni